Martin Stockinger (born 10 February 1984) is an Austrian cross-country skier. He competed in the men's sprint event at the 2006 Winter Olympics.

References

External links
 

1984 births
Living people
Austrian male cross-country skiers
Olympic cross-country skiers of Austria
Cross-country skiers at the 2006 Winter Olympics
Sportspeople from Upper Austria
People from Rohrbach District
21st-century Austrian people